The 2009 Bergen International Film Festival was arranged in Bergen, Norway 21st-28 October 2009, and was the 10th edition of the festival.

Important screenings
Opening film:
  In the Loop, directed by Armando Iannucci 
Closing film: 
 A Serious Man, directed by Joel and Ethan Coen

Films in competition

Cinema Extraordinare - In competition
 About Elly, directed by Asghar Farhadi 
 Angel at Sea, directed by Frédéroc Dumon 
 Buick Riviera, directed by Goran Rušinović 
 Choi voi, directed by Bui Thac Chuyen 
 Cosmonauta, directed by Susanna Nicchiarelli 
 Devil's Town, directed by Vladimir Paskaljevic 
 Fransesca, directed by Bobby Paunescu 
 Humpday, directed by Lynn Shelton 
 Men on the Bridge, directed by Aslı Özge 
 No One's Son, directed by Arsen Anton Ostojić 
 The Time That Remains, directed by Elia Suleiman 
 Wolfy, directed by Vasili Sigarev 
 Whisky with Vodka, directed by Andreas Dresen

Documentaries - In competition
 Afghan Star, directed by Havana Marking  
 Art & Copy, directed by Doug Pray  
 Objectified, directed by Gary Hustwit  
 End of the Line, directed by Rupert Murray  
 The Yes Men Fix the World, directed by Andy Bichlbaum, Mike Bonanno and Kurt Engfehr  
 Unmistaken Child, directed by Nati Baratz

Norwegian Short Film Competition
 Ella, regi Hanne Larsen
 Den tredje dagen, regi Beate Pedersen
 Gjemsel, Alexandra Niemczyk
 Motholic Mobble 3 & 4, regi Kaia Hugin
 Saíva, regi Tuva Synnevåg
 Skylappjenta, regi Iram Haq

Jubilee program
On the occasion of the 10th version of the Bergen International Film Festival, festival leader Tor Fosse arranged a special jubilee program consisting of special films that where important in the creation of independent Norwegian film festivals in 80s and 90s.

 Yeelen (1987), directed by Souleymane Cissé 
 The Oak (1992), directed by Lucian Pintilie 
 My Friend Ivan Lapshin (1984), directed by Aleksei German,  
 Crazy Love (1987), directed by Dominique Deruddere,

Awards

Cinema Extraordinare
 2009: No One's Son, directed by Arsen Anton Ostojić

The Audience Award
 2009: Bring Children from Streets, directed by Espen Faugstad and Eivind Nilsen

Best Documentary
 2009: Afghan Star, directed by Havana Marking

Youth Jury's Documentary Award
 2009: The Cove, directed by Louie Psihoyos

Best Norwegian Short Film
 2009: Skylappjenta, directed by Iram Haq

Young Talent Award
2009: Espen Faugstad and Eivind Nilsen

External links
Official site

Bergen International Film Festival, 2009
Bergen International Film Festival
Bergen International Film Festival
Bergen International Film Festival

no:Bergen internasjonale filmfestival